Traditional papier-mâché offering shops in Hong Kong sell papier-mâché offerings for sacred purposes and for festival-celebration purposes. Their popularity has grown since the 1940s. Nowadays, the demand of papier sacred products is reducing, and thus papier-mâché shops and the entire industry is facing decline.

History
Papier-mâché offering shops started popping up in Hong Kong since 1940. From 1940, there was a high demand of papier-mâché offerings, and the papier-mâché industry was prosperous. Shops were run by the whole family and they manufactured and sold the papier-mâché products all on their own. In the 1950s, the Communist Party in China began to simplify funeral services through education, persuasion, and step-by-step measures, following to the cultural revolution started from 1960, the Communist Party destroyed many traditional practices and imposed simplism, they simplified traditional cultures and most of the traditional funeral rites were being dissuaded in mainland. This led to mainland papier-mâché shop-owners flocking in to Hong Kong to continue their business. After 1980, Hong Kong transformed into an International Financial Centre which promoted knowledge-based economy, so people were no longer willing to work in papier-mâché sectors, which led to the gradual decline of the industry in Hong Kong. Nowadays in Hong Kong, not only is the demand for papier-mâché products low, but over one-ninth of papier-mâché products are imported from mainland China, Local papier-mâché offering shops that produce their own stock for sale are uncommon nowadays.

Occasions and target customers
There are generally two types of papier-mâché products: papier-mâché for festival celebrations, and for funeral use. Papier-mâché offering shops occasionally target their customers by providing various papier-products according to different festivals and occasions. The people who mostly want to consecrate their offerings are mainly Taoists, some Buddhists and those who still conducting ancestral worship.

Festivals

During Chinese New Year, shops provide paper money, joss sticks, Fai Chun and lighted red candles for good luck inscriptions.  Paper offerings are in demand at Ghost Festival, various offerings such as joss paper accessories, altar candles, papier-mâché form of items (i.e. gold, clothes, bank notes), or other goods for the visiting spirits of ancestors, those all have a strong footing in the paper offerings market. Traditionally, candles in wooden bowls are placed on street corners or along rivers to guide wandering spirits to the feasts prepared for them. Shops provide joss paper, accessories paper and incense, selling to the public to sacrifice their ancestors in Qingming Festival. In the Mid-Autumn Festival  and Lantern Festival, shops sell candles and paper lanterns, which are used for celebration. Families are willing to buy such items for children in the Mid-Autumn Festival.

Funerals
Chinese funerals (mainly Taoist funerals) are the occasions which required paper offerings most. Paper horse and paper goat is a must in the funeral ceremony. Those offerings are used for liberating souls from purgatory, fulfilling the needs of the souls in the underworld, such as paper currency, clothes, food, houses, and transports. Nowadays, products of paper offerings for funerals are nearly life sized, for example, televisions, iPhones, or other electronics. This is an innovative mixture of modern and ancient civilization. In this case, the target customers are people who conduct the Taoist funerals.

Famous papier-mâché shops in Hong Kong

The papier-mâché offering shops with a long history in Hong Kong are mostly clustered together in Queen's Road West and Queen’s Road Central. Bo Wah Paper Craft and Chau Zi Paper Craft are two well-known papier-mâché offering shops because of their long history.

Bo Wah Paper Craft 
Bo Wah Paper Craft  is established in 1963 and located in Sham Shui Po. The owner used to make traditional papier-mâché lion’s heads for Chinese New Year, but Au Yeung Bing Chi, the son of the owner, have changed the style of papier-mâché from traditional to modish in order to cater for the modern society and to create a new trend. Papier-mâché can be customized in Bo Wah; for instance, creative papier-mâché products such as a stormtrooper from Star Wars and specific bones of the human skeleton are available in the shop.

Chau Zi Paper Craft
Chau Zi Paper Craft, established in 1930 and located in Central, is one of the oldest papier-mâché shops in Hong Kong. The owner Chan Kui Chau is a well-known Hong Kong papier-mâché maker who made traditional papier-mâché products such as the trotting horse lamp. Chau Zi attracts tourists from all over the world who come to visit, order and explore traditional Chinese papier-mâché products.

Comparison between different papier-mâché offering shops around the world

Papier-mâché is a popular and common tradition across the whole of Asia. Besides China and Hong Kong, papier-mâché offering shops are being set-up in Japan, Vietnam and Chinese oversea communities in Southeast Asia with their unique cultures.

Japan

People have made papier-mâché by themselves since the Tang dynasty. Yet, due to the economic development, people started to set up shops afterwards. Unlike in Hong Kong, the papier-mâché shops in Japan sell traditional paper products like orizuru (Japanese paper crane), omamori and Japanese traditional dolls for bowing and making wishes in the Shrines and Temples.

Vietnam
In Vietnam, the Hàng Mã Street located in Hanoi, has been selling paper goods for more than 500 years.

Western countries
Shops are even set up in Western countries like the USA or United Kingdom by Chinese immigrants. For example, Mulberry Street in New York, also known as Chinatown, has papier-mâché retailers which are similar to those in Hong Kong. They serve the Chinese who are living there to celebrate Chinese festivals.

Interior design and architectural style

Papier-mâché shops in Hong Kong are usually designed in traditional Chinese style without fancy decoration. The layout seems to be disorganised but the goods are arranged in an orderly fashion. A large tablet placed on top of the door with the name of the shop written in gold, yellow or red, around which there are some Chinese lanterns for decoration. Some shelves are put outside the shops for displaying products. For the setting, some simple closets are placed all around the shop with a variety of products on them. A glass case table forms a corner for the shop owner. Generally there are tables placed in the middle of the shop, with a lot of packages of foss paper and papier-mâché put on them for ancestor worship, which is sorted by plastic baskets or cartons. The 3D papier-mâché items are wrapped in plastic bags and hung inside the shop.  During some traditional Chinese festivals, such as the mid-autumn festival, the festive products will also be wrapped in plastic bags and hung outside the shop to attract customers.

References

Chinese folk religion in Hong Kong
Culture of Hong Kong
Chinese New Year
Death customs
Taoist art
Papier-mâché